A Barcalounger is a type of recliner that originated from Buffalo, New York, and is named after the company which manufactured it.  Like other recliners, Barcaloungers have moving parts to change things such as the inclination of the back.

Chair
The Barcalounger chair was introduced by the Barcalo Manufacturing Company of Buffalo, New York, which eventually became the Barcalounger Company. The chairs are currently produced in China.

Company
The Barcalounger Company, once named the Barcalo Manufacturing Company, was  founded by Edward J. Barcalo in 1896. It is the oldest manufacturer of reclining chairs in the U.S.A.

After the company filed for bankruptcy in 2010, it shuttered its facilities in Rocky Mount, North Carolina and Martinsville, Virginia, then restarted manufacturing at the plant in Morristown, Tennessee, in 2011, for manufacture of the Barcalounger chair. It is owned by the private equity firm Hancock Park Associates.

Barcalo Manufacturing also made beds in Welland, Ontario, under the Quality Beds name in the first decade of the 20th century.

Development of the "coffee break"
Barcalo, the country's oldest manufacturer of reclining chairs, is reputed to be the first American company to allow its employees coffee breaks, in 1902.

In popular culture
In Kurt Vonnegut's God Bless You, Mr. Rosewater (1965), Barcaloungers make an appearance in a reference to Kilgore Trout's novel 2 B R 0 2 B, where they provide luxury seating for wannabe suicides, with government encouragement; "2 B R 0 2 B" is actually a 1962 Vonnegut short story in which Barcaloungers do not figure. In the same author's Slaughterhouse-Five (1969), Billy Pilgrim is strapped to a yellow Barcalounger in the alien's flying saucer as he is abducted and taken to their planet.

In John Updike's Rabbit Is Rich (1981), a Barcalounger originally belonging to Grandpa Fred Stringer looms large in the tensions between Harry "Rabbit" Angstrom and his son Nelson.

In Cheers season 11, episode 8, Norm brings a Barcalounger into the bar for Thanksgiving dinner.

Joey and Chandler from the hit NBC sitcom Friends owned a set of Barcalounger recliners, which were often used as a plot device within the show.

In the "Call Me Irresponsible" episode of another hit NBC sitcom, Frasier (Season 1, Episode 7), the eponymous star brings a new girlfriend Catherine (played by Amanda Donohoe) home. They are about to have sex on the vibrating chair belonging to Marty Crane (Frasier's father). Frasier exclaims, "I won't be out-performed by a Barcalounger" before moving to the couch.

It is mentioned in the US version of the TV show Shameless, in the Season 5 premiere, titled "Milk of the Gods", as part of a conversation Mickey has with a potential furniture customer.

A 7-inch single by Me First and the Gimme Gimmes was called "In Your Barcalounger".

It is mentioned in the cinematic intro of the 1995 side-scrolling platform game Gex by publisher Crystal Dynamics.

It is the chair in which Paul's father always sits in Philip Roth's Letting Go.

It appears in the film BASEketball, starring Trey Parker and Matt Stone.

It is mentioned and seen in the (2000) drama film, The Family Man. Jack's (Nicolas Cage) friend Arnie (Jeremy Piven) says, “Oh I know, I put the Barcalounger in the center of the room, and it’s throwing everybody off.” 

There is a mention in the (2003) film Runaway Jury, making a point that the average juror does not have a vested interest in the court proceeding, but that they would rather sit at home in their Barcalounger watching cable TV.

The Barcalounger is also mentioned in the Robin Williams film RV (2006): "...maybe even a Barcalounger that massages your ass and blows smoke at the same time."

In ‘’Falx Cerebri’’ (season 2, episode 6) of Sons of Anarchy, at a SAMCRO executive board meeting about the club’s possible retaliation, Bobby asks, “You think Zobelle is just sitting in his Barcalounger waiting for us to stop by?”

It is mentioned in Gilmore Girls season 7, episode 8, after Christopher and Lorelai come home from getting married in Paris. Christopher is trying to talk Lorelai into getting a BarcaLounger with a waterfall in the wall behind it. Christopher describes it as “soft leather, button back pad, adjustable footrest.”

See also
 La-Z-Boy

Notes

External links
 Official site
 Bankruptcy filing

Chairs
Individual models of furniture